Siphonodentalium is a genus of small tusk shells in the family Gadilidae.

Species
 Siphonodentalium australasiae Boissevain, 1906
 Siphonodentalium booceras (Tomlin, 1926)
 Siphonodentalium colubridens (R. B. Watson, 1879)
 Siphonodentalium coronatum V. Scarabino & F. Scarabino, 2011
 Siphonodentalium dalli (Pilsbry & Sharp, 1898)
 Siphonodentalium delicatulum (Suter, 1913)
 Siphonodentalium hexaschistum (Boissevain, 1906)
 Siphonodentalium isaotakii Habe, 1953
 Siphonodentalium jaeckeli Scarabino, 1995
 Siphonodentalium japonicum Habe, 1960
 Siphonodentalium laubieri Bouchet & Warén, 1979
 Siphonodentalium lobatum (G. B. Sowerby II, 1860)
 Siphonodentalium longilobatum (Boissevain, 1906)
 Siphonodentalium magnum (Boissevain, 1906)
 Siphonodentalium minutum Z.-Y. Qi, X.-T. Ma & J.-L. Zhang, 1998
 Siphonodentalium okudai Habe, 1953
 † Siphonodentalium parisiense (Deshayes, 1861) 
 Siphonodentalium promontorii (Barnard, 1963)
 Siphonodentalium summa (Okutani, 1964)
Synonyms
 Siphonodentalium affine Sars M., 1865: synonym of Pulsellum affine (M. Sars, 1865)
  † Siphonodentalium bouryi Cossmann, 1888: synonym of  † Dischides bouryi (Cossmann, 1888)( superseded combination)
 Siphonodentalium bushae (Henderson, 1920): synonym of Pulsellum bushae (J. B. Henderson, 1920) (original combination)
 Siphonodentalium dichelum R. B. Watson, 1879: synonym of Dischides dichelus (R. B. Watson, 1879) (original combination)
 Siphonodentalium eboracense R. B. Watson, 1879: synonym of Pulsellum eboracense (R. B. Watson, 1879) (original combination)
 Siphonodentalium galatheae Knudsen, 1964: synonym of Striopulsellum galatheae (Knudsen, 1964) (original combination)
 Siphonodentalium kikuchii Kuroda & Habe, 1952: synonym of Compressidens kikuchii (Kuroda & Habe, 1952) (original combination)
 Siphonodentalium lofotense M. Sars, 1865: synonym of Pulsellum lofotense (M. Sars, 1865) (original combination)
 †  Siphonodentalium meyeri Cossmann, 1888: synonym of †  Polyschides meyeri (Cossmann, 1888) (unaccepted > superseded combination)
 Siphonodentalium minimum Plate, 1909: synonym of Striopulsellum minimum (Plate, 1909) (original combination)
 Siphonodentalium occidentale Henderson, 1920: synonym of Pulsellum occidentale (Henderson, 1920)
 Siphonodentalium olivi: synonym of Polyschides olivi (Scacchi, 1835)
 Siphonodentalium platamodes R. B. Watson, 1879: synonym of Entalina platamodes (R. B. Watson, 1879) (original combination)
 Siphonodentalium prionotum R. B. Watson, 1879: synonym of Dischides prionotus (R. B. Watson, 1879) (original combination)
 Siphonodentalium quadridentatum Dall, 1881: synonym of Polyschides tetraschistus (R. B. Watson, 1879)
 Siphonodentalium quadrifissatum (Pilsbry & Sharp, 1898): synonym of Polyschides quadrifissatus (Pilsbry & Sharp, 1898)
 Siphonodentalium striatinum Henderson, 1920: synonym of Striopulsellum striatinum (Henderson, 1920)
 Siphonodentalium subfusiforme Sars M., 1865: synonym of Cadulus subfusiformis (M. Sars, 1865)
 Siphonodentalium teres Jeffreys, 1883: synonym of Pulsellum teres (Jeffreys, 1883)
 Siphonodentalium tetraschistum R. B. Watson, 1879: synonym of Polyschides tetraschistus (R. B. Watson, 1879) (original combination)
 Siphonodentalium verrilli Henderson, 1920: synonym of Pulsellum verrilli (Henderson, 1920)

References

 Bouchet, P. & Warén, A., 1979 The abyssal molluscan fauna of the Norwegian Sea and its relation to the other faunas Sarsia, 64(3) 211-243
 Gofas, S.; Le Renard, J.; Bouchet, P. (2001). Mollusca. in: Costello, M.J. et al. (eds), European Register of Marine Species: a check-list of the marine species in Europe and a bibliography of guides to their identification. Patrimoines Naturels. 50: 180-213. 
 Spencer, H.G., Marshall, B.A. & Willan, R.C. (2009). Checklist of New Zealand living Mollusca. Pp 196-219. in: Gordon, D.P. (ed.) New Zealand inventory of biodiversity. Volume one. Kingdom Animalia: Radiata, Lophotrochozoa, Deuterostomia. Canterbury University Press, Christchurch.

External links
 Sars, M. (1859). Bidrag til en skildring af den arktiske molluskfauna ved Norges nordlige kyst. Forhandlinger i Videnskabs-Selskabet i Christiania. (1858): 34-87
  Sars, M. (1861). Om Siphonodentalium vitreum, en ny Slaegt og Art af Dentalidernes Familie. 23 pp. + 3 pl. Christiania, Brøgger & Christie
 Steiner, G.; Kabat, A. R. (2001). Catalogue of supraspecific taxa of Scaphopoda (Mollusca). Zoosystema. 23(3): 433-460

Scaphopods